The ANU Joint Colleges of Science is the combined sciences faculty at the Australian National University. They deliver research and teaching in science, environment, medicine and health. The Colleges count five Nobel laureates including the current Vice Chancellor, Professor Brian Schmidt who jointly won the 2011 Nobel Prize in Physics. The Colleges also boast other prominent academics such as Graham Farquhar who is the first Australian to win a Kyoto Prize in Basic Sciences for his life's work in plant biophysics and photosynthesis, which has involved research on water-efficient crops and the impacts of climate change.

Components

 ANU College of Science:
 Research School of Astronomy and Astrophysics 
 Research School of Biology
 Research School of Chemistry
 Research School of Earth Sciences
 Fenner School of Environment and Society
 Mathematical Sciences Institute
 Research School of Physics
 Centre for the Public Awareness of Science
 ANU College of Health and Medicine:
 The John Curtin School of Medical Research
 ANU Medical School
 Research School of Population Health
 Research School of Psychology

Degrees within the Joint Colleges of Science
 Undergraduate Courses:
Bachelor of Biotechnology
 Bachelor of Environment & Sustainability
 Bachelor of Environment & Sustainability (Advanced)(Honours)
 Bachelor of Genetics
 Bachelor of Health Science
 Bachelor of Mathematical Sciences
 Bachelor of Medical Science
Bachelor of Philosophy (Honours) (ANU) / Bachelor of Science (Honours) (NUS)
Bachelor of Philosophy (Honours) (PhB)
Bachelor of Psychology (Honours)
Bachelor of Science
Bachelor of Science (Advanced)(Honours)
Bachelor of Science (Psychology)
Diploma of Science
 Postgraduate Courses:
 Doctor of Medicine and Surgery (MChD)
 Master of Astronomy & Astrophysics (Advanced)
 Master of Biotechnology
 Master of Biotechnology (Advanced)
 Master of Climate Change (With ANU College of Asia Pacific) 
 Master of Clinical Psychology
 Master of Earth Sciences (Advanced)
 Master of Energy Change
 Master of Environment
 Master of Environment (Advanced)
 Master of Environmental Science
 Master of Environmental Science (Advanced)
 Master of Forestry
 Master of Forestry (Advanced)
 Master of Mathematical Sciences (Advanced)
 Master of Neuroscience
 Master of Neuroscience (Advanced)
 Master of Public Health
 Master of Philosophy
 Master of Public Health (Advanced)
 Master of Science Communication
 Master of Science Communication Outreach
 Master of Science in Biological Sciences
 Master of Science in Biological Sciences (Advanced)
 Master of Science in Quantitative Biology and Bioinformatics
 Master of Science in Quantitative Biology and Bioinformatics (Advanced)
 Master of Science in Quantum Technology
 Master of Science in Science Communication (NUS, Singapore)

References

External links 
ANU Joint Colleges of Science Website

Australian National University